Jeffrey Dean Mittie (born June 24, 1966) is the current head coach of the Kansas State University women's basketball team.

Career
Prior to joining the Wildcats, he was the head coach of TCU Horned Frogs women's basketball team.

He is the all-time wins leader at TCU with 303 wins.

Head coaching record

References

External links
 Kansas State profile

1966 births
Living people
American women's basketball coaches
Arkansas State Red Wolves women's basketball coaches
Basketball coaches from Missouri
Kansas State Wildcats women's basketball coaches
Missouri Western Griffons women's basketball coaches
People from Blue Springs, Missouri
Sportspeople from the Kansas City metropolitan area
TCU Horned Frogs women's basketball coaches